Delmarva Broadcasting Company was a privately-owned radio company, which operated radio stations in Maryland, Delaware and New Jersey. It was a wholly owned asset of the Steinman family of Lancaster, Pennsylvania. Steinman Enterprises also operates numerous other companies, including Lancaster Newspapers, Inc., Lancaster Newspapers and Intelligencer Printing, as well as farming and coal mines.

Headquartered in Wilmington, Delaware, Delmarva Broadcasting Company owned 10 radio stations in four markets. 

On October 10, 2008 Delmarva Broadcasting joined Radiolicious and began streaming on the iPhone and iPod Touch.

On February 5, 2019, Forever Media announced its intent to acquire Delmarva Broadcasting and its 10 stations for $18.5 million. This sale was completed on May 20, 2019.

Stations

References

External links
Company site

Defunct radio broadcasting companies of the United States
Companies based in Wilmington, Delaware
Companies with year of establishment missing